Hale is a village and civil parish in the Halton unitary authority of Cheshire, England. According to the 2001 census it had a population of 1,898, decreasing to 1,841 by the 2011 census. The village is north of the River Mersey, and just to the east of the boundary with Merseyside. It is 2½ miles east of Speke in Liverpool, and 4 miles south-west of Widnes. The nearby village of Halebank is to the north-east.

Historically part of Lancashire, until 1 April 1974 the area formed part of the Whiston Rural District.

Notable people
John Middleton (1578–1623), the Childe of Hale, was reputed to be nine feet, three inches tall, or 2.8 m. His cottage and grave are located in the village. Just outside St Mary's Church was a wooden carving of the Childe Of Hale that is said to have been life-sized. It was replaced in 2013 by a 3-metre bronze statue by sculptor Diane Gorvin.

Audrey Withers (1905–2001), editor of Vogue between 1940 and 1960, was born in Hale, where her father was a local doctor.

Charles Peter Fleetwood-Hesketh (1905-1985), (usually known as Peter Fleetwood-Hesketh), was the last "lord of the manor" of Hale, and resided at The Manor House, Hale from 1947-1985. An architect and architectural historian, he served in the Second World War, partly in co-ordination with the Maquis (guerrilla fighters) in occupied France.

Former Liverpool footballer Jermaine Pennant also lived in Hale.

Hale Head Lighthouse
Hale Head is the southernmost point in the historic county of Lancashire. A lighthouse was established here in 1838; the original octagonal structure was superseded by a taller cylindrical tower in 1906. The rebuilding was overseen by John Arthur Saner, civil engineer. The light was discontinued in 1958 because of a decline in shipping, and sold a few years later for £1,100; the building remains in use as a private residence. The former optic is now in Merseyside Maritime Museum.

See also

List of listed buildings in Hale, Halton
Hale Duck Decoy

References

External links

 Hale Village Online
 Visit Hale Village 

Villages in Cheshire
Civil parishes in Cheshire
Borough of Halton